The 9th Company is a 2005 Russian war film directed by Fedor Bondarchuk and set during the Soviet–Afghan War. The film is loosely based on a real-life battle that took place at Elevation 3234 in early 1988, during Operation Magistral, the last large-scale Soviet military operation in Afghanistan. It received generally positive reviews from critics.

Plot

At a farewell ceremony in Krasnoyarsk, a band of young Soviet Army recruits is preparing to leave for military duty. Lyutyi (Artur Smolyaninov) one of the conscripts forms a group along with Chugun (Ivan Kokorin), Gioconda (Konstantin Kryukov), Ryaba (Mikhail Evlanov), Stas (Artyom Mikhalkov), Seryi (Ivan Nikolaev), and Vorobey (Aleksey Chadov). They have different interests and personalities that initially make it difficult for them to form bonds with each other.

On arrival at their bootcamp in the Fergana Valley of Uzbekistan, they meet another recruit, Pinochet (Soslan Fidarov), a Chechen recruit from Grozny, and their drill instructor, Senior Praporschik Dygalo, a seasoned, traumatized veteran of several tours in Afghanistan and a brutal trainer who treats the recruits harshly. During their training, the recruits overcome their differences and build bonds. Between the training sessions, they receive lessons in operating plastic explosives and a presentation on the ethnic groups and customs of Afghanistan. During an orientation, a Soviet General asks if anyone in the VDV has changed their minds as they are about to be reassigned to another unit. Vorobey and Seryi initially intend to quit but decide to stay in the unit.

Later, Dygalo wakes up the recruits and beats everyone in a frantic manner. Although many claim that he is suffering from mental breakdown, they later learn that he wanted to go with them to Afghanistan but his request got rejected. The recruits then leave for Afghanistan on a plane.

On their arrival at Bagram air base, they are greeted by a group of VDV troops who have fulfilled their military service and are due to return home. One of the departing soldiers gives one of the new arrivals, Lyutyi, a talisman that he claims has kept him safe through several tours and multiple firefights. After departing, the transport plane is hit by a rocket coming from the nearby mountains, resulting in its disintegration and combustion after hitting fuel after its emergency landing, giving the new recruits their first taste of war. Shortly thereafter, the soldiers are assigned to the 9th company, where their trainer and drill instructor, Dygalo, had previously served. Pinochet and Ryaba however are reassigned to another unit, separating him from Lyutyi and his friends.

Upon arriving there, they meet Warrant Officer Pogrebnyak "Khokhol" (Fedor Bondarchuk) who is Dygalo's second-in-command. They also meet Sergeant Afanasiev "Afanasiy" (Dmitry Mukhamadeev) and Sergeant Kurbanhaliev "Kurbashi" (Amadu Mamadakov) and learn that they all had served with Dygalo before he was sent away to a hospital. Meanwhile, Chugun is given by Pomidor (Aleksandr Bashirov) the beaten up machine gun that Private Samylin used during his duty in Afghanistan. Khokhol tells about Dygalo's life on the company and tells his habits during his tours of duty in Afghanistan. Later the company leaves the headquarters to deliver supplies to an outpost of Soviet troops which would be the new component of the 9th company. While traveling to the base, Afanasiy tells the new members of the company that their allies, the Afghan Army, is demoralized and weakened by mass desertion of its officers during the war. Upon delivering all the supplies needed and spending most of the night on the base, Patefon (Aleksandr Sheyn) invites the company for a shooting exercise. They come across a group of mujahideen led by Akhmed (Marat Gudiev), who exchanges insults with Patefon before engaging in a short skirmish. The next day Vorobey encounters Akhmed, holds him at gunpoint, and shoots and kills him after being frightened when he slips on a rock, making him the first one on the company to kill a mujahid. The company then leaves for its next mission.

The company is soon deployed to the front as a part of Operation Magistral and receive the order to hold a nameless hill at all costs. They fortify the hill and turn it into a base. That night however, they are attacked by a group of mujahideen. Only Ryaba survives the attack as the far cordon was entirely annihilated by the attack, leaving him speechless and crippled. To make sure that the mujahideen don't start an attack again, several soldiers are ordered to guard the hill. Stas however falls asleep during guard duty and is beaten up by Khokhol, Afanasiy and Kurbashi. The next day, Gioconda is instructed to find matches. He encounters an old Afghan man, who, despite the language barrier, leads him to his village. Fearing an ambush, Gioconda arrives in the village and enters the house of the man. Upon seeing an old man, he starts saying "haram." He is eventually given matches by a kid living there in return for food. As he leaves the village, he encounters members of the company led by Captain Bystrov (Aleksei Kravchenko), who were ready to storm the village.

A couple days later, a convoy arrives to the base, but is ambushed by the mujahideen, resulting in many casualties and several vehicles destroyed. During the shootout, an injured Ryaba suffers from a mental breakdown and is shot in the head as he yells for the fighting to stop. Captain Bystrov is also killed in action during the fire fight. Meanwhile, Khokhol, Lyutyi, and Vorobey attack the underground positions of the mujahideen, but are forced to return upon learning that their enemies are already in the village. The company then attempts to clear out the village, which appears to be empty. Stas sees a young boy and decides to spare him, but as soon as he turns around he is shot in the back by the boy and dies shortly thereafter. The company is forced to leave as the village is shelled by BM-21 Grad rocket launchers, while the company lament the death of Stas.

Later, Afanasiy leads some men of the company to steal food cans from a passing army convoy. The soldiers then tell each other their plans for the future after they are discharged from duty in Afghanistan. That night, the company celebrates New Year's Eve by drinking to their fallen comrades while listening to Mikhail Gorbachev's speech on the radio. Pinochet then arrives in the company's base to reunite with his friends: he got into trouble with his unit and was thus reassigned to the 9th company. Welcoming him, the company then celebrate by dancing to some Soviet pop Music.

The next morning, while the entire company is asleep, Gioconda goes outside of the base to draw the landscape. While he is drawing, a large group of Mujahideen arrives and he is shot in the head while trying to warn the others of the upcoming assault. Reacting to the surprise attack, 9th Company fires back but are shelled by mortars. As he tries to ask for reinforcements by radio, Patefon is killed by a mortar shell resulting in disruptions in the communication network. The company is able to return to the trenches and engage the mujahideen, Khokhol orders some of the men to shell the enemy positions with mortars but Khokhol's position is hit by a rocket that kills two of his men, preventing further shelling of enemy lines. Soon, the mujahideen break the line and hand-to-hand combat ensues. Another round of shelling begins and a rocket kills Khokhol while Kurbashi is killed by a bullet. Vorobey is hit on his knees while fighting and is unable to make his way to the lines of his comrades, Chugun uses his machine gun to attack the mujahideen in the hopes of covering him but is killed shortly afterwards. Injured and being approached by mujahideen fighters, Vorobey detonates a grenade on himself. This leads Lyutyi to fearlessly charge the approaching mujahideen lines with Samylin's machine gun along with the company. They briefly gain the upper hand and are able to push the fighters back in their positions.

Stranded with low ammunition and no means of communications, the company takes stock of the situation: only seven of them survived, all officers are dead, and they're running low on ammunition. Lyutyi, along with Afanasiy, leads the last men of the company in defense of the hill. They encounter the last fighters and fearlessly fight them till the last man when Mil Mi-24 helicopter gunships arrive and kill the remaining Afghan fighters. During the fight, Afanasiy is shot in the chest while the last of the company are killed.

Lyutyi is the only one from the company who remains alive. Speechless and crippled, he tells the Colonel (Andrey Krasko) that the convoy now may pass as the 9th company has fulfilled their duty and mission. The colonel says that there will be no convoy as the Soviets are already withdrawing from Afghanistan and wonders why they haven't heard the orders on the radio. Upon realizing what happened to the 9th Company, the colonel comforts him. Lyutyi passes through the dead bodies of the entire company and removes the talisman from his neck as he kneels to the ground and cries.

Later on February 15, 1989, a column of BTR-70 is seen leaving Afghanistan. Lyutyi is on one of the vehicles along with other soldiers departing Afghanistan. He narrates that two years later the country they have been fighting for, the Soviet Union, had ceased to exist and that wearing its medals had become unfashionable. He also speaks of the fate of Senior Praporschik Dygalo, who after being reassigned to Tula to train recruits, will die a year later from a stroke on a night march, and of Snow White, who along with her mother with other Russian families, will remain in Fergana Valley, Uzbekistan until disappearing without a trace. He also says that years later the veterans like him in the conflict will be scattered ruthlessly by their new lives. He concludes by saying that the 9th Company won its own war.

Cast

Release

Critical reception
Based on 16 reviews collected by Rotten Tomatoes, The 9th Company has an overall approval rating from critics of 69%, with an average score of 5.93/10.

The film received a mixed reaction from the veterans of that war, who pointed to a number of inaccuracies, but nevertheless, judging by ticket sales, it was embraced by the general public and even by Russian President Vladimir Putin. Although first released in 2005, and broadcast on TV in several nations, it was not released in the US until 2010 on DVD.

Box office
The film was released in September 2005 and was successful in the Russian box office, generating $7.7 million in its first five days of release alone, a new domestic record.

Awards

In 2006, Russia selected the film as its candidate for the Academy Award for Best Foreign Language Film nomination. It was also given the Golden Eagle Award for Best Feature Film by the Russian Academy of Cinema Arts.

See also
 The Truth About 9th Company

References

External links
  
 
 
 

Russian historical action films
Russian war drama films
2000s war drama films
2005 films
Films directed by Fedor Bondarchuk
Films produced by Fyodor Bondarchuk
Military of Russia in films
Films about military personnel
Finnish war drama films
Ukrainian war drama films
Soviet–Afghan War films
Films set in 1988
Films set in Afghanistan
Films shot in Crimea
Films shot in Moscow
Films shot in Uzbekistan
2005 directorial debut films
2005 drama films
Russian-language Finnish films